The Churchill–Roosevelt Highway, sometimes refers to as CRH, is the major east–west highway on Trinidad island in Trinidad and Tobago.

It crosses the north–south Uriah Butler Highway (UBH) at Valsayn. Constructed during World War II to connect the US Army base with Port of Spain, the highway was named for the two wartime leaders, Winston Churchill and Franklin D. Roosevelt.

Construction began in December 1941 and was completed in March 1942. Originally reserved for the US armed forces, the road was turned over to the Government of Trinidad and Tobago on October 24, 1949.

Description

The Churchill-Roosevelt Highway can be considered the most important highway in the country, running alongside the densely populated East-West Corridor, with an estimated population of 600,000. Because of this, it is often extremely congested.

Route 
The Churchill-Roosevelt highway begins at the Barataria interchange, where it becomes the Beetham Highway heading west into Port of Spain. The highway then passes south of San Juan and through El Socorro/Aranguez. Soon after the Aranguez overpass, the highway intersects with the north-south Uriah Butler Highway just west of Valsayn. The highway continues eastwards past Curepe, St. Augustine, Tunapuna and Trincity. At the Piarco intersection, BWIA Boulevard provides direct access to the Piarco International Airport, south of the highway. The highway then continues past Maloney, Mausica and Arima. The highway terminates at a junction with Antigua Road in Wallerfield.

Features 
Despite being one of the most important highways in the country, it is not entirely grade separated. Every major intersection after Curepe is signalized, leading to gridlock traffic congestion during peak times. The Barataria interchange connects to Morvant and Barataria via a connector road, while the Aranguez and Curepe interchanges are simple overpasses. The Grand Bazaar interchange is the largest and most important of the interchanges on the entire highway system, where it crosses the Uriah Butler Highway. 

The highway is a 6 lane dual carriageway from Barataria to Mausica, and then narrows to 4 lanes before terminating at Wallerfield. It is notable though that some sections of the highway contain additional lines and divided frontage roads. At the Grand Bazaar interchange, the underpass is 2 lanes westward and 3 lanes eastward with the north to west and east to south ramps respectively carrying 2 lanes each, hence there being as much as 9 lanes on the highway at this point. There is also a frontage road on the eastbound lane from Valpark to Grand Bazaar, which provides access to Bamboo No. 2 and 3, as well as the exits to the northbound and southbound lanes of the Uriah Butler Highway from the east. At this point, the highway carries as much as 10 lanes due to an additional 2 lanes on the westbound lane for merging purposes. At the Curepe interchange, divided frontage roads also add to the number of lanes, with as much as 10 lanes. After these major interchanges, additional lanes are only joined to the highway at junctions for turning or merging. 

There are 6 pedestrian overpasses along the course of the highway between Barataria and Macoya.

History
When WWII commenced, Trinidad became an important strategic point in the war effort. Through the Bases Agreement signed by British PM, Sir Winston Churchill, and the US president, Franklin Delano Roosevelt, Britain got 50 old American destroyers, and the US was granted the right to establish bases in the British Territories. Although the US Army had several bases on the island by 1941, the most important were Chaguaramas and the Air Base at Wallerfield, called Fort Read. The road communications between the Port of Spain (POS) and Fort Read near Cumuto was problematic as it consisted solely of the crowded Eastern Main Road, which slowed down the large convoys moving between the two bases. The decision was made in 1941 to build a military two lane paved road between Fort Read and the Morvant Junction of the Eastern Main Road just outside POS (the extension of the highway, the Beetham Highway, would not be built until the 1950s.)

Work began almost immediately, with the highway forever bisecting rural communities like St. Augustine, El Socorro and Tacarigua. Many crop farmers had to be moved as bulldozers ploughed the course. This era in history is documented in Samuel Selvon's classic novel, A Brighter Sun, where an inexperienced Indian youth is thrust headlong into the highway-building process. When the road was opened in 1942, it was the finest road in the island, being smooth and pothole free from end to end. It was not immediately asphalted, as it was pressed into service for the convoys almost as soon as the way was graded (a stark contrast to our roads today). Wilson Minshall, father of masman Peter Minshall, remarked “The new Roosevelt–Churchill Highway has swept across the country from Cumuto to a point near Laventille with the force of a flood rushing into a quiet valley. Cleared and graded but not yet surfaced, its naked earth weaves and interweaves protesting patterns under the wheels of army trucks and construction tractors that cannot wait until the road is finished.

Opened in 1942 and reserved exclusively for military traffic, with exceptions being made for top-ranking civil service personnel. Military police in jeeps constantly patrolled the 15 mile road looking for violators.

The highway was finally opened up for civilian use on October 4, 1949.

Auxiliary Routes 

 EMR/CRH Link - This route provides access to Lady Young Road and the Eastern Main Road at Barataria.
 Aranguez/El Socorro Access Road - This route provides access to El Socorro North from the Aranguez Overpass.
 Churchill Roosevelt Highway Frontage Road - This route runs alongside the westbound lane of the highway at Valsayn, providing access to the southbound and northbound ramps and connecting Bamboo No. 2 with Grand Bazaar and the westbound lane of the highway.

Planned extensions and upgrades
There are currently plans to extend the Churchill–Roosevelt Highway from Wallerfield to Manzanilla as a fully grade separated four-lane expressway. These plans have begun with the widening of the highway from Mausica to Maloney to six-lanes, and construction of the section that bisects the Aripo Savanna.

Much of the highway suffers from congestion due to an aging collection of traffic lights on most major junctions. There are plans to convert the entire highway into a grade separated expressway including the construction of new interchanges. Notable are the Uriah Butler Highway interchange just west of Valsayn and the Curepe Interchange at the intersection with the Southern Main Road.

References

https://www.opm.gov.tt/16544-2/

Roads in Trinidad and Tobago
Trinidad (island)
Transport infrastructure completed in 1942
1940s establishments in Trinidad and Tobago
1942 establishments in North America